Nogometni klub Plama Podgrad, commonly referred to as NK Plama Podgrad or simply Plama, is a Slovenian football club from Podgrad. The team currently plays in the Littoral League, the fourth highest league in Slovenia. The club was founded in 1982.

References

External links
Official website 

Association football clubs established in 1982
Municipality of Ilirska Bistrica
Football clubs in Slovenia
1982 establishments in Yugoslavia